The 1992 Pittsburgh Steelers season was the franchise's 60th season as a professional sports franchise and as a member of the National Football League.

The Pittsburgh Steelers celebrated their 60th Anniversary season in 1992. This was also Bill Cowher's first season as head coach following the retirement of Chuck Noll after 23 seasons. The team was coming off a 7–9 season in 1991.

Cowher led the Steelers to an 11–5 record in his first season and the top seed in the AFC playoffs. However, in what later became commonplace in Cowher's reign as coach of the Steelers, the team failed to capitalize on the seeding and lost to the eventual AFC champion Buffalo Bills in the divisional playoffs.

Offseason

NFL draft

Staff

Notable additions include Levon Kirkland, Joel Steed, Darren Perry and Yancey Thigpen

Roster

Preseason

Schedule

Regular season

Schedule

Game summaries

Week 1 (Sunday September 6, 1992): at Houston Oilers 

at Astrodome, Houston, Texas

 Game time: 1:00 pm EDT
 Game weather: Dome
 Game attendance: 63,713
 Referee: Gary Lane
 TV announcers: (NBC) Charlie Jones (play by play), Todd Christensen (color commentator)

Bill Cowher wins his first game as Steelers Head Coach.

Scoring drives:

 Houston – Meads 15 fumble return (Del Greco kick)
 Houston – Givins 11 pass from Moon (Del Greco kick)
 Pittsburgh – Foster 1 run (Anderson kick)
 Pittsburgh – FG Anderson 30
 Houston – FG Del Greco 36
 Pittsburgh – Graham 26 pass from O'Donnell (Anderson kick)
 Houston – Givins 8 pass from Moon (Del Greco kick)
 Pittsburgh – FG Anderson 25
 Pittsburgh – FG Anderson 37
 Pittsburgh – Cooper 9 pass from O'Donnell (Anderson kick)

Week 2 (Sunday September 13, 1992): vs. New York Jets  

at Three Rivers Stadium, Pittsburgh, Pennsylvania

 Game time: 4:00 pm EDT
 Game weather: 75 °F (Sunny)
 Game attendance: 56,050
 Referee: Gordon McCarter
 TV announcers: (NBC) Charlie Jones (play by play), Todd Christensen (color commentator)

Scoring drives:

 New York Jets – FG Staurovsky 32
 Pittsburgh – Foster 23 run (Anderson kick)
 New York Jets – Brim 77 interception return (Staurovsky kick)
 Pittsburgh – FG Anderson 28
 Pittsburgh – Foster 54 run (Anderson kick)
 Pittsburgh – FG Anderson 35
 Pittsburgh – Griffin 65 interception return (Anderson kick)

Week 3 (Sunday September 20, 1992): at San Diego Chargers  

at Jack Murphy Stadium, San Diego, California

 Game time: 4:00 pm EDT
 Game weather:
 Game attendance: 46,127
 Referee: Pat Haggerty
 TV announcers: (NBC) Charlie Jones (play by play), Todd Christensen (color commentator)

Scoring drives:

 San Diego – FG Carney 24
 Pittsburgh – Cooper 24 pass from O'Donnell (Anderson kick)
 San Diego – FG Carney 43
 Pittsburgh – Stone 6 pass from O'Donnell (kick failed)
 Pittsburgh – O'Donnell 1 run (Anderson kick)
 Pittsburgh – FG Anderson 42

Week 4 (Sunday September 27, 1992): at Green Bay Packers  

at Lambeau Field, Green Bay, Wisconsin

 Game time: 4:00 pm EDT
 Game weather:
 Game attendance: 58,724
 Referee: Howard Roe
 TV announcers: (NBC) Charlie Jones (play by play), Todd Christensen (color commentator)

Scoring drives:

 Pittsburgh – FG Anderson 35
 Green Bay – FG Jacke 47
 Green Bay – Sharpe 76 pass from Favre (Jacke kick)
 Green Bay – Brooks 8 pass from Favre (Jacke kick)

Week 5 (Sunday October 4, 1992): Bye Week

Week 6 (Sunday October 11, 1992): at Cleveland Browns  

at Cleveland Municipal Stadium, Cleveland, Ohio

 Game time: 1:00 pm EDT
 Game weather:
 Game attendance: 78,080
 Referee: Larry Nemmers
 TV announcers: (NBC) Joel Meyers (play by play), Ahmad Rashad (color commentator)

Scoring drives:

 Pittsburgh – FG Anderson 25
 Pittsburgh – FG Anderson 36
 Cleveland – FG Stover 51
 Cleveland – Mack 1 run (Stover kick)
 Pittsburgh – FG Anderson 40
 Cleveland – Jackson 47 pass from Tomczak (Stover kick)

Week 7 (Monday October 19, 1992): vs. Cincinnati Bengals  

at Three Rivers Stadium, Pittsburgh, Pennsylvania

 Game time: 9:00 pm EDT
 Game weather: 32 °F (Clear)
 Game attendance: 55,411
 Referee: Gerald Austin
 TV announcers: (ABC) Al Michaels (play by play), Frank Gifford & Dan Dierdorf (color commentators)

Scoring drives:

 Pittsburgh – FG Anderson 21
 Pittsburgh – Stone 24 pass from O'Donnell (Anderson kick)
 Pittsburgh – Stone 5 pass from O'Donnell (Anderson kick)
 Pittsburgh – FG Anderson 27

Week 8 (Sunday October 25, 1992): at Kansas City Chiefs  

at Arrowhead Stadium, Kansas City, Missouri

 On October 24, 1992, Eddie Murray (American football) signed with the Kansas City Chiefs to play this game in place of an injured Nick Lowery. He was released on October 28.

 Game time: 7:30 pm EST
 Game weather:  • 
 Game attendance: 76,175
 Referee: Tom White
 TV announcers: NFL on TNT (TNT) Gary Bender (play by play), Pat Haden (color commentator)

Scoring drives:

 Pittsburgh – Woodson 80 punt return (Anderson kick)
 Pittsburgh – FG Anderson 49
 Pittsburgh – FG Anderson 30
 Kansas City – FG Murray 52
 Pittsburgh – Foster 4 run (Anderson kick)
 Pittsburgh – Green 4 pass from O'Donnell (Anderson kick)

Week 9 (Sunday November 1, 1992): vs. Houston Oilers  

at Three Rivers Stadium, Pittsburgh, Pennsylvania

 Game time: 1:00 pm EST
 Game weather: 47 °F (Light Rain)
 Game attendance: 58,074
 Referee: Ed Hochuli
 TV announcers: (NBC) Marv Albert (play by play), Bill Parcells (color commentator)

Scoring drives:

 Houston – FG Del Greco 29
 Houston – FG Del Greco 19
 Pittsburgh – Foster 1 run (Anderson kick)
 Houston – Slaughter 11 pass from Carlson (Del Greco kick)
 Houston – Childress 8 fumble return (Del Greco kick)
 Pittsburgh – Cooper 2 pass from O'Donnell (Anderson kick)
 Pittsburgh – Green 5 pass from O'Donnell (Anderson kick)

Week 10 (Sunday November 8, 1992): at Buffalo Bills  

at Rich Stadium, Orchard Park, New York

 Game time: 4:00 pm EST
 Game weather:
 Game attendance: 80,294
 Referee: Bob McElwee
 TV announcers: (NBC) Marv Albert (play by play), Bill Parcells (color commentator)

Scoring drives:

 Buffalo – Lofton 22 pass from Kelly (Christie kick)
 Pittsburgh – FG Anderson 28
 Buffalo – Frerotte 2 pass from Kelly (Christie kick)
 Buffalo – Thomas 1 run (Christie kick)
 Pittsburgh – FG Anderson 49
 Pittsburgh – Mills 12 pass from O'Donnell (Anderson kick)
 Buffalo – Lofton 45 pass from Kelly (Christie kick)
 Pittsburgh – Hoge 11 pass from O'Donnell (Anderson kick)

Week 11 (Sunday November 15, 1992): vs. Detroit Lions  

at Three Rivers Stadium, Pittsburgh, Pennsylvania

 Game time: 1:00 pm EST
 Game weather: 29 °F (Snow Showers)
 Game attendance: 52,242
 Referee: Johnny Grier
 TV announcers: (CBS) Sean McDonough (play by play), John Robinson (color commentator)

Scoring drives:

 Pittsburgh – Mills 11 pass from O'Donnell (Anderson kick)
 Pittsburgh – FG Anderson 20
 Detroit – Green 73 pass from Kramer (Hanson kick)
 Detroit – Sanders 1 run (Hanson kick)
 Pittsburgh – Jorden 1 pass from Brister (Anderson kick)

Week 12 (Sunday November 22, 1992): vs. Indianapolis Colts  

at Three Rivers Stadium, Pittsburgh, Pennsylvania

 Game time: 1:00 pm EST
 Game weather: 64 °F (Light Rain)
 Game attendance: 51,101
 Referee: Gary Lane
 TV announcers: (NBC) Tom Hammond (play by play), Cris Collinsworth (color commentator)

Scoring drives:

 Pittsburgh – Foster 20 run (Anderson kick)
 Pittsburgh – FG Anderson 31
 Pittsburgh – FG Anderson 22
 Indianapolis – Culver 1 run (Biasucci kick)
 Pittsburgh – Foster 13 run (Anderson kick)
 Pittsburgh – Thompson 2 run (Anderson kick)
 Indianapolis – Culver 4 pass from Trudeau (Biasucci kick)
 Pittsburgh – FG Anderson 36

Week 13 (Sunday November 29, 1992): at Cincinnati Bengals  

at Riverfront Stadium, Cincinnati, Ohio

 Game time: 1:00 pm EST
 Game weather:
 Game attendance: 54,253
 Referee: Jerry Markbreit
 TV announcers: (NBC) Dan Hicks (play by play), John Dockery (color commentator)

Scoring drives:

 Pittsburgh – Davenport 34 fumble return (Anderson kick)
 Cincinnati – FG Breech 33
 Pittsburgh – Foster 2 run (Anderson kick)
 Cincinnati – FG Breech 42
 Pittsburgh – Foster 1 run (Anderson kick)
 Cincinnati – FG Breech 38

Week 14 (Sunday December 6, 1992): vs. Seattle Seahawks  

at Three Rivers Stadium, Pittsburgh, Pennsylvania

 Game time: 1:00 pm EST
 Game weather: 25 °F (Cloudy)
 Game attendance: 47,015
 Referee: Larry Nemmers
 TV announcers: (NBC) Jim Lampley (play by play), Ahmad Rashad (color commentator)

Scoring drives:

 Pittsburgh – Mills 19 pass from O'Donnell (Anderson kick)
 Pittsburgh – FG Anderson 38
 Seattle – Kane 28 pass from Gelbaugh (Kasay kick)
 Seattle – Williams 3 pass from Gelbaugh  (Kasay kick)
 Pittsburgh – Foster 4 run (Anderson kick)
 Pittsburgh – FG Anderson 39

Week 15 at Bears  

{{Americanfootballbox
|bg=
|bg2=
|titlestyle=; text-align:center
|state=collapsed
|title=Week Fifteen: Pittsburgh Steelers (10–3) at Chicago Bears (4–9)
|date=December 13, 1992
|time=1:00 p.m. EST
|road=Steelers
|R1=0 |R2=3 |R3=0 |R4=3
|home=Bears
|H1=3 |H2=10 |H3=7 |H4=10
|stadium=Soldier Field, Chicago, Illinois
|attendance=52, 904
|weather=
|referee=Gerald Austin
|TV=NBC
|TVAnnouncers=Marv Albert and Bill Parcells
|reference=Pro-Football-Reference, The Football Database
|scoring=
First quarter
CHI – Kevin Butler 37-yard field goal, 3:40. Bears 3–0. Drive:
Second quarter
CHI – Darren Lewis 3-yard run (Kevin Butler kick), 6:27. Bears 10–0. Drive:
CHI – Kevin Butler 26-yard field goal, 0:50. Bears 13–0. Drive:
PIT – Gary Anderson 38-yard field goal, 0:08. Bears 13–3. Drive:
Third quarter
CHI – Neal Anderson 15-yard pass from Jim Harbaugh (Kevin Butler kick), 6:20. Bears 20–3. Drive:
Fourth quarter
CHI – Kevin Butler 38-yard field goal, 13:35. Bears 23–3. Drive:
PIT – Gary Anderson 38-yard field goal, 10:05. Bears 23–6. Drive:
CHI – Neal Anderson 6-yard run (Kevin Butler kick), 3:02. Bears 30–6. Drive:'
|stats=
Top passers
PIT – Bubby Brister – 14/31, 143 yards, 2 INT
CHI – Jim Harbaugh – 11/21, 90 yards, TD
Top rushers
PIT – Barry Foster – 12 rushes, 25 yards
CHI – Neal Anderson – 11 rushes, 56 yards, TD
Top receivers
PIT – Adrian Cooper – 3 receptions, 58 yards
CHI – Wendell Davis – 3 receptions, 41 yards
}}

 Week 16 (Sunday December 20, 1992): vs. Minnesota Vikings  at Three Rivers Stadium, Pittsburgh, Pennsylvania Game time: 1:00 pm EST
 Game weather: 37 °F (Sunny)
 Game attendance: 53,613
 Referee: Dick Hantak
 TV announcers: (CBS) Verne Lundquist (play by play), Dan Fouts (color commentator)

Scoring drives:

 Pittsburgh – FG Anderson 23
 Minnesota – FG Reveiz 38
 Minnesota – FG Reveiz 36

 Week 17 (Sunday December 27, 1992): vs. Cleveland Browns  at Three Rivers Stadium, Pittsburgh, Pennsylvania Game time: 1:00 pm EST
 Game weather: 32 °F (Sunny)
 Game attendance: 53,776
 Referee: Bob McElwee
 TV announcers: (NBC) Joel Meyers (play by play), Paul Maguire (color commentator)

Scoring drives:

 Pittsburgh – Foster 7 run (Anderson kick)
 Cleveland – FG Stover 22
 Pittsburgh – Jorden 2 pass from Brister (Anderson kick)
 Pittsburgh – FG Anderson 26
 Cleveland – M. Jackson 38 pass from Tomczak (Stover kick)
 Pittsburgh – FG Anderson 29
 Cleveland – FG Stover 22
 Pittsburgh – FG Anderson 28

Standings

Playoffs

 Game summary 

 AFC Divisional Playoff (Saturday January 9, 1993): vs. Buffalo Bills  at Three Rivers Stadium, Pittsburgh, Pennsylvania''

 Game time: 12:30 pm EST
 Game weather: 37 °F (Light Rain)
 Game attendance: 60,407
 Referee: Bernie Kukar
 TV announcers: (NBC) Marv Albert (play by play), Bill Parcells (color commentator), John Dockery (Pittsburgh Sideline) and O. J. Simpson (Buffalo Sideline)

Scoring drives:

 Pittsburgh – FG Anderson 38
 Buffalo – Frerotte 1 pass from Reich (Christie kick)
 Buffalo – Lofton 17 pass from Reich (Christie kick)
 Buffalo – FG Christie 43
 Buffalo – Gardner 1 run (Christie kick)

Awards, honors, and records
 Bill Cowher, AP NFL Coach of the Year
 Bill Cowher, Sporting News NFL Coach of the Year

References

External links
 1992 Pittsburgh Steelers season at Pro Football Reference 
 1992 Pittsburgh Steelers season statistics at jt-sw.com

Pittsburgh Steelers seasons
Pittsburgh Steelers
AFC Central championship seasons
Pitts